Collocalia is a genus of swifts, containing some of the smaller species termed "swiftlets". Formerly a catch-all genus for these, a number of its former members are now normally (though not by all authors) placed in Aerodramus.

The genus Collocalia was introduced by the English zoologist George Robert Gray in 1854. The name Collocalia combines the classical Greek words kolla meaning "glue" and kalia for "nest".

The genus previously contained fewer species. Seven subspecies of the glossy swiftlet were promoted to species status based on a detailed analysis of the swiftlets in the genus Collocalia published in 2017.

Species

Extant 
The genus now contains the following 11 species:
 Plume-toed swiftlet, Collocalia affinis (formerly treated as a subspecies of the glossy swiftlet)
 Grey-rumped swiftlet, Collocalia marginata  (formerly treated as a subspecies of the glossy swiftlet)
 Ridgetop swiftlet, Collocalia isonota (formerly treated as a subspecies of the glossy swiftlet)
 Tenggara swiftlet, Collocalia sumbawae (formerly treated as a subspecies of the glossy swiftlet)
 Drab swiftlet, Collocalia neglecta (formerly treated as a subspecies of the glossy swiftlet)
 Glossy swiftlet, Collocalia esculenta
 Satin swiftlet, Collocalia uropygialis (formerly treated as a subspecies of the glossy swiftlet)
 Bornean swiftlet, Collocalia dodgei
 Cave swiftlet, Collocalia linchi
 Christmas Island swiftlet, Collocalia natalis (formerly treated as a subspecies of the glossy swiftlet)
 Pygmy swiftlet, Collocalia troglodytes

Fossil species 
An Early Miocene fossil swiftlet from the Riversleigh deposits of Australia was described as Collocalia buday. This as well as a right ulna (MNZ S42799) found at the Bannockburn Formation of the Manuherikia Group near the Manuherikia River in Otago, New Zealand. Dating from the Early to Middle Miocene (Altonian, 19-16 million years ago), probably belongs to Aerodramus.

References

Bibliography 
 Worthy, Trevor H.; Tennyson, A.J.D.; Jones, C.; McNamara, J.A. & Douglas, B.J. (2007): Miocene waterfowl and other birds from central Otago, New Zealand. J. Syst. Palaeontol. 5(1): 1-39.  (HTML abstract)

 
Swifts
Taxa named by George Robert Gray
Taxonomy articles created by Polbot